The 1974 Ice Hockey World Championships were the 41st Ice Hockey World Championships and the 52nd European Championships in ice hockey. The tournament took place in Finland from 5 to 20 April and the games were played in the capital, Helsinki. Six teams took part in the main tournament, all playing each other twice. The Soviet Union won the world championships for the 13th time, and also won their 16th European title.

The event was the second Ice Hockey World Championships hosted by Finland, and was organized by Harry Lindblad, president of the Finnish Ice Hockey Association.

For the first time in ice hockey World Championship history, two players were suspended for doping. They were the Swede Ulf Nilsson and the Finn Stig Wetzell who failed a drug test for the forbidden substance ephedrine. Both players were suspended for the rest of the tournament. Nilsson failed the test after Sweden's game against Poland, which Sweden won 4–1. The game was awarded to Poland as a 5–0 forfeit. The Finn, Wetzell, failed the test after Finland's match against Czechoslovakia, which Finland won 5–2, which was also awarded to Czechoslovakia as a 5–0 forfeit.  The Finns were able to defeat Czechoslovakia again on the last day, which would have earned the Finns their first medal in history, if not for the points lost in the forfeited win.

World Championship Group A (Finland)

East Germany were very unlucky to be relegated to Group B, as Poland's only win was the awarded default for a doping violation against Sweden.

World Championship Group B (Yugoslavia)
Played in Hala Tivoli, Ljubljana, SR Slovenia, SFR Yugoslavia 21–30 March.

The USA was promoted to Group A, and both Norway and Austria were relegated to Group C.

World Championship Group C (France)
Played in Grenoble, Gap and Lyon, 8–17 March.  This was North Korea's first World Championship.

Switzerland and Italy were promoted to Group B.

Ranking and statistics

Tournament Awards
Best players selected by the directorate:
Best Goaltender:       Vladislav Tretiak
Best Defenceman:       Lars-Erik Sjöberg
Best Forward:          Václav Nedomanský
Media All-Star Team:
Goaltender:  Curt Larsson
Defence:  Lars-Erik Sjöberg,  Valeri Vasiliev
Forwards:  Vladimír Martinec,  Václav Nedomanský,  Alexander Yakushev

Final standings
The final standings of the tournament according to IIHF:

European championships final standings
The final standings of the European championships according to IIHF:

References

Complete results

IIHF Men's World Ice Hockey Championships
World Championships
1974
International sports competitions in Helsinki
Ice Hockey World Championships
1970s in Helsinki
Ice Hockey World Championships
International ice hockey competitions hosted by Yugoslavia
International ice hockey competitions hosted by France
Sports competitions in Ljubljana
1970s in Ljubljana
Sports competitions in Grenoble
20th century in Grenoble
Sports competitions in Lyon
20th century in Lyon
1973–74 in French ice hockey
1973–74 in Yugoslav ice hockey
1974 in Slovenia